Adama Ouédraogo (born 3 April 1987 in Yopougon, Côte d'Ivoire) is a Burkinabé swimmer who is specializes in freestyle. He competed in the 50 m event at the 2012 Summer Olympics. In 2019, he represented Burkina Faso at the 2019 African Games held in Rabat, Morocco.

He competed in the men's 50m freestyle event at the 2020 Summer Olympics.

References

External links 
 
 

1987 births
Living people
Burkinabé male freestyle swimmers
Olympic swimmers of Burkina Faso
Swimmers at the 2012 Summer Olympics
Sportspeople from Abidjan
Swimmers at the 2019 African Games
African Games competitors for Burkina Faso
Swimmers at the 2020 Summer Olympics
21st-century Burkinabé people